Voices is the second and final studio album by American rock band Matchbook Romance. The album's sound leaves behind much of the stripped down sound of their debut, Stories and Alibis, opting for a darker, more foreboding tone. The album was released through Epitaph Records on February 14 in the US. accompanied by the single "Monsters", and radio only single "Surrender".

Background
Vocalist Andrew Jordan adopts a much different vocal style for this record than their previous, bringing the band closer to the second-wave emo sound. The band chose to tune the all their guitars down half a step to help with the change. The cover of the album was designed by Shawn Harris from pop punk band The Matches.

Inside the album's packaging is a small plastic panel, with alternating black and transparent strips. This panel can be aligned with parts of the album's artwork to reveal secret messages. Hence "there are voices in the walls." Some of the lyrics to the hidden track can also be found in typos in the lyrics of the other songs.

Release
The track "Monsters" was featured as the lead single from Voices, going on to be featured in video games such as Guitar Hero III: Legends of Rock, Madden NFL 07 and Arena Football: Road to Glory.

Track listing
 "You Can Run, But We'll Find You..." – 4:08
 "Surrender" – 4:50
 "My Mannequin Can Dance" – 4:02
 "Goody, Like Two Shoes!" – 7:11
 "Monsters" – 4:05
 "Say it Like You Mean It" – 4:23
 "Portrait" – 4:27
 "Singing Bridges (We All Fall)" – 5:15
 "Fiction" – 3:26
 "What a Sight" – 4:30
 "I Wish You Were Here" – 15:40
Ends at 3:40, untitled hidden track starts at 7:40.

Personnel
Matchbook Romance
 Andrew Jordan - lead vocals, guitars, piano
 Ryan "Judas" DePaolo - guitars, vocals, programming
 Ryan Kienle - bass
 Aaron Stern - drums, percussion

Other musicians
 Phil Peterson - Cello & string arrangements on 'Goody, Like Two Shoes', 'Say It Like You Mean It', 'What A Sight' and 'Surrender'
 Victoria Parker - Violin on 'Goody, Like Two Shoes' and 'I Wish You Were Here'
 Trish Scearce - Pump organ on 'I Wish You Were Here'
 Mark Rank - Piano on 'My Mannequin Can Dance', 'You Can Run, But We'll Find You'

Production
 John Goodmanson - Producer
 Greg Calbi - Mastering
 Mike Lapierre - Additional engineer 
 Brain Thorn - Additional engineer
 Mark Renk - Vocal coaching
 Dana Childs - Project coordinator
 Benji Woerly - Drum technician
 Philip Pierce - Guitar technician

Artwork
 Emilee Seymour & Shawn Harris

Layout
 Nick Pritchard

Charts

References

External links
 Matchbook Romance at Epitaph
 Matchbook Romance at Myspace.

2006 albums
Matchbook Romance albums
Epitaph Records albums
Albums produced by John Goodmanson
Albums recorded at Long View Farm